Willy Kuijpers (1 January 1937 – 17 November 2020) was a Belgian politician.

Career
A Flemish nationalist, he sat in the Belgian Federal Parliament (both as a representative and a senator), the Flemish Parliament, and the European Parliament, as well as being active in local politics and serving as mayor of Herent. He had a particular interest in education policy and international development aid.

Kuijpers died from COVID-19 in 2020.

References

1937 births
2020 deaths
Belgian politicians
20th-century Belgian politicians
Deaths from the COVID-19 pandemic in Belgium